The eleventh season of the American horror anthology television series American Horror Story, subtitled NYC, takes place in 1980s New York City, and focuses on a string of killings involving gay men and the emergence of a new virus. The ensemble cast includes Russell Tovey, Joe Mantello, Billie Lourd, Denis O'Hare, Charlie Carver, Leslie Grossman, Sandra Bernhard, Isaac Powell, Zachary Quinto, and Patti LuPone, with all returning from previous seasons, except newcomers Tovey, Mantello and Carver.

Created by Ryan Murphy and Brad Falchuk for cable network FX, the series is produced by 20th Century Fox Television. NYC was broadcast between October 19 to November 16, 2022, consisting of 10 episodes. The subtitle was announced in September 2022.

Cast and characters

Main

 Russell Tovey as Patrick Read, a closeted NYPD detective
 Joe Mantello as Gino Barelli, a reporter for the New York Native and Patrick's partner
 Billie Lourd as Dr. Hannah Wells, a scientist and doctor who has discovered a new virus
 Denis O'Hare as Henry Grant, a Brownstone Bar regular and mafia hitman
 Charlie Carver as Adam Carpenter, a gay man disgusted with the apathy of the police
 Leslie Grossman as Barbara Read, a devastated woman going through a harrowing divorce process
 Sandra Bernhard as Fran, a lesbian activist and fortune teller who is trying to solve the constant problems in the city
 Isaac Powell as Theo Graves, a photographer interested in the grotesque
 Zachary Quinto as Sam, a partying man who is involved in the cases

 Patti LuPone as Kathy Pizazz, a cabaret singer, bathhouse owner, former Broadway star

Recurring
 Clara McGregor as KK, a lesbian activist and girlfriend of Fran
 Quei Tann as Lita
 Jeff Hiller as Mr. Whitely, a serial killer with a completely macabre purpose
 Rebecca Dayan as Alana, manager of one of the most frequented gay bars in New York City
 Kyle Beltran as Morris, a gay man with too much euphoria to wear out
 Brian Ray Norris as Det. Mulcahey
 Matthew William Bishop as Big Daddy, a heavily muscular serial killer who has been scaring NYC residents, especially gay people
 Kal Penn as Chief of Detectives Mac Marzara
 Casey Thomas Brown as Hans Henkes (based on real-life performance artist Klaus Nomi)
 Hale Appleman as Daniel Kanowicz
 Gideon Glick as Cameron Dietrich

Guest
 Lee Aaron Rosen as Captain Ross
 Jared Reinfeldt as John "Sully" Sullivan
 Danny Garcia as Chief Manney
 Taylor Bloom as Stewart
 Hannah Jane McMurray as Shachath, the Angel of Death. The character was previously portrayed by Frances Conroy in Asylum.
 Sis as Dunaway

Episodes

Production

Development
On January 9, 2020, American Horror Story was renewed for up to a thirteenth season. In February 2022, FX chairman John Landgraf stated that the eleventh season would feature only one story, unlike Double Feature, though it would take place "in different timelines". On September 29, 2022, the official title of the season was revealed to be NYC and that the season would premiere on October 19, 2022. On October 6, 2022, a teaser trailer for the season was released on the show's social media pages.

Casting
Ahead of any official cast announcements, Billie Lourd, Charlie Carver, Isaac Cole Powell, and Sandra Bernhard were seen filming on set. Additionally, Zachary Quinto, Patti LuPone, and Joe Mantello were reported to be appearing in the season. On August 30, 2022, series veteran Denis O'Hare confirmed his appearance on Twitter. Leslie Grossman, Russell Tovey, Rebecca Dayan, Kal Penn and Gideon Glick also appeared in the season.

Filming
Filming officially began in New York on June 14, 2022, and concluded on October 28, 2022.

Release
The season premiered on October 19, 2022. For the first time in the show's history, two episodes aired each week instead of only one.

Reception

Streaming viewership 
According to Whip Media's viewership tracking app TV Time, American Horror Story was the fifth most anticipated returning television series of October 2022. According to the streaming aggregator Reelgood, American Horror Story: NYC was the tenth most streamed program across all platforms, during the week ending October 26, 2022. According to the streaming aggregator JustWatch, American Horror Story: NYC was the fifth most streamed television series across all platforms in the United States, during the week of October 24, 2022, to October 30, 2022, the sixth during the week of October 31, 2022, to November 6, 2022, and the seventh during the week of November 7, 2022, to November 13, 2022.

Critical response 
The review aggregator website Rotten Tomatoes reports a 71% approval rating, based on 7 reviews for the season, with an average rating of 6.80/10.

Emma Stefansky of The Daily Beast stated, "There is an air of unknown doom that hangs about the show even in its first episodes, with people repeatedly mentioning a feeling of ominousness permeating the city, muttering things like, “Something dark is coming.” Isn't it always? AHS: NYC has all the Murphy-esque signatures, and more: It's sexy, it's salacious, and it's subversive—not least because of the era and the community in which it's set. Like most seasons of this show, NYC starts strong, though it's difficult at this point to say exactly what's going on. Who is the leather mask daddy with a murderous streak? Is this perhaps an origin story for the rubber man ghost from all the way back in Season 1? As a horror-tinged dramatization of the oppression that urban marginalized communities faced in Reagan's America, it works, so far.” Kayla Cobb of Decider wrote, "American Horror Story: NYC has been the most realistic this series has ever been. Instead of witches, ghosts, and vampires, this installment is all about serial killers and incompetent cops. But just because this show has a newfound dedication to realism, that doesn't mean there weren't some over-the-top flourishes."

Magdalene Taylor of Vulture said, "For now, we can rely on one thing about this season: It will be sexy. AHS almost always is, but the queer ’80s New York City setting offers far more creative and erotic fodder than, say, the dilapidated North Carolina colonial farmhouse of AHS: Roanoke. The leather, the coke, the soundtrack — even if the plot this season fails us, at least we’ll be fed aesthetically. There are not yet any ghosts, vampires, witches, or demons, but if this season is entirely grounded in reality, it’s at least a gritty and exciting one to see. Though this might not be as big of a hit as Dahmer or The Watcher, AHS fans likely won’t be starved of the campy theatricalism we’ve come to adore." Ron Hogan of Den of Geek gave American Horror Story: NYC a grade of 4 out of 5 stars, asserting, "Now that sort of wild conspiracy theory feels more like the AHS I’m used to. People on the hunt for a serial killer is all well and good, and can be very fun, but it wouldn’t be Ryan Murphy and Brad Falchuk without something crazier than shirtless hunks in cages to really liven things up. NYC might be more David Fincher’s Zodiac than a take on William Lustig’s Maniac for the moment, but there’s always that undercurrent of weirdness to everything American Horror Story does that’s just waiting to move from a subplot to the main feature."

Accolades 

In its eleventh season, the series has been nominated for one award.

References

External links
 
 

2020s American drama television series
2022 American television seasons
11
BDSM-related mass media
Gay-related television shows
Ghosts in television
HIV/AIDS in television
Serial killers in television
Television series set in 1981
Television shows set in New York City